Acrocercops xeniella is a moth of the family Gracillariidae. It is known from Colombia.

References

xeniella
Gracillariidae of South America
Moths described in 1877